Protoxaea is a genus of bees in the family Andrenidae. There are at least three described species in Protoxaea.

Species
These three species belong to the genus Protoxaea:
 Protoxaea australis Hurd & Linsley, 1976
 Protoxaea gloriosa (Fox, 1893) (glorious protoxaea)
 Protoxaea micheneri Hurd & Linsley, 1976

References

Further reading

External links

 

Andrenidae
Articles created by Qbugbot